Of Mythic Worlds is an album by composer, bandleader and keyboardist Sun Ra and his Arkestra recorded around 1979 and released on the Philly Jazz label.

Reception

The Allmusic review by Sean Westergaard states "This is another album that will probably be tough to find but well worth it".

Track listing
All compositions by Sun Ra except where noted
 "Mayan Temples" – 7:48 
 "Over the Rainbow (Harold Arlen, Yip Harburg) – 5:15
 "Inside the Blues" – 5:45
 "Intrinsic Energies" – 8:40 
 "Of Mythic Worlds" – 12:55

Personnel
Sun Ra – piano, organ, synthesizer
Marshall Allen – alto saxophone, flute, oboe
John Gilmore – tenor saxophone, percussion
James Jacson – bassoon, flute, percussion
Danny Ray Thompson – baritone saxophone, flute
Eloe Omoe – bass clarinet, flute
Richard Williams – bass
Luqman Ali – drums
Atakatune – percussion

References 

Sun Ra albums
Philly Jazz albums
1980 albums